Banshee is a power metal band that was formed in 1986 in the American Midwest. Although they shared the image and sound with the glam/metal scene of the 80s, their music also displays elements of melodic power metal: catchy guitar riffs, eclectic drums and bass, powerful guitar solos, and intense vocals.

Biography
Banshee, a melodic power metal band from the American Midwest, was formed by guitarist Terry Dunn in the spring of 1986. It was made up of members from the popular Midwest touring act Lick (Tommy Lee and Chuck Hopkins); Terry Dunn of Kansas City-based Frodo, Granmax, and Kent Burnham from Kansas City-based Crypt Keeper. By late 1986, they released their first EP entitled Cry in the Night. Hopkins left shortly thereafter to pursue other projects in Los Angeles and was replaced by local Kansas City bassist Bill Westfall.

In 1988, Metal Blade Records re-released Cry In The Night and included the song "We Want You" on a compilation record, Metal Massacre No. 9.

In 1989, the band began recording at Record Plant Studios and on September 15, 1989, released their first album, Race Against Time, on Atlantic Records Titanium label. The album was released on vinyl, compact disk, and cassette tape. Shortly thereafter, Banshee parted ways with Atlantic Records.

In 1993, the band self-released their second album, Take 'Em By Storm, with the outfit disbanding shortly after the initial release.

Reunion shows were played in 1999, 2000, and 2008. After numerous hiatuses throughout the 90s and most of the 2000s, Banshee reunited in 2008 to perform at Rocklahoma which was ultimately an ill-fated performance for the band. It was after this that founder and guitarist Terry Dunn realized the band needed drastic changes if the band was to continue.

On June 21, 2012, the band released their third studio album entitled Mindslave on Snowblind Records. The album featured vocalist George Call (ASKA, Violent Storm, Omen, Cloven Hoof), original bassist Chuck Hopkins, and drummer Marty Schiermann. After the initial release and in preparation for the Mindslave tour, Hopkins and Schiermann were both unable to tour with the band and Mika Horiuchi (ex-Falling In Reverse and ex-Celador) from Los Angeles, California stepped up on bass, while Vinnie E. Parma (MYSTERY, Hillbilly Orchestra, HONEY) from Dallas, Texas took the role of drums. 

In May 2017, Banshee signed to Visionary Noise Records and on July 9, 2019, Banshee's fourth studio album entitled The Madness was released. Additionally, Visionary Noise Records re-released Mindslave on a limited pressing double-sided picture disc vinyl.

Members

Current
Terry Dunn – guitars (1985–present)
George Call – vocals (2011–present)
Vinnie E. Parma – drums (2012–present)

Former
Tommy Lee Flood – vocals (1985–1993, 1999–2000, 2008–2009)
Kent Burnham – drums, percussion (1985–1993, 1999–2000, 2008)
Chuck Hopkins – bass (1985–1986, 2008–2014, 2015–2018)
Bill Westfall – bass (1986–1993, 1999–2000, 2014–2015), keyboards (1989) (died 2020)

Session Members
Tyson Leslie – bass (2008 Rocklahoma Reunion Concert)
Marty Schiermann – drums (2011–2012 Mindslave Sessions, 2018-2019 The Madness Sessions)
Mika Kazuo Horiuchi – bass (2012 Tour)
Blu Davis – bass (2019 Festivals & Whisky A Go-Go)

Timeline

Discography

EPs
Cry In The Night (August 12, 1986)

LPs
Race Against Time (September 15, 1989)
Take 'Em By Storm (1993)
Mindslave (June 21, 2012)
The Madness (July 9, 2019)

Demos
"Demo '91" (1991)
"The Slam" (1991)

References

External link
  Bansheerocks.com
 Sleaze Roxx: Banshee - Race Against Time

American power metal musical groups
Heavy metal musical groups from Kansas